Status dystonicus is a serious and potentially life-threatening disorder which occurs in people who have primary or secondary dystonia. Symptoms consist of widespread severe muscle contractions. Treatment can be difficult but status dystonicus may respond to midazolam, propofol, baclofen and bilateral pallidal deep brain stimulation.

References

Extrapyramidal and movement disorders
Dystonia